Shawn Brooks Kiehne (born July 3, 1976) is an American New Mexico musician from Los Lunas, New Mexico, he is best known by his Norteño stagename El Gringo, he also performs country music under the name Shawn Brooks.

Kiehne, who is of German heritage, was born in Los Lunas and graduated from Los Lunas High School. Kiehne learned Spanish working at his family's ranch in the El Paso, Texas area. In 2003 he began writing songs in the language. In 2005 he won second place in El Gigante de Mañana and his first album, Algo Secuedió, was released later the same year.

References

1976 births
American country guitarists
American male guitarists
Living people
American country singer-songwriters
American male singer-songwriters
American performers of Latin music
American people of German descent
American ranchera singers
Rock en Español musicians
Songwriters from New Mexico
Singers from New Mexico
New Mexico music artists
People from Los Lunas, New Mexico
Spanish-language singers of the United States
Guitarists from New Mexico
21st-century American singers
21st-century American guitarists
21st-century American male singers